Dávid Gyenes (born 18 April 1986 in Budapest) is a Hungarian football player. He plays for Ferencvárosi TC in the Hungarian NB I.
He played his first league match in 2011.

Honours
Ferencváros
Hungarian League Cup (1): 2012–13

References

1986 births
Living people
Footballers from Budapest
Hungarian footballers
Association football goalkeepers
Budapest Honvéd FC players
Vecsés FC footballers
Ferencvárosi TC footballers